The Court of Tax Appeals is the special court of limited jurisdiction, and has the same level with the Court of Appeals. The court consists of 8 Associate Justices and 1 Presiding Justice. The Court of Tax Appeals is located on Agham Road, Diliman, Quezon City in Metro Manila.

History 

The Court of Tax Appeals was originally created by virtue of Republic Act. No. 1125 (R.A.1125) which was enacted on June 16, 1954, composed of three (3) Judges with Mariano B. Nable as the first Presiding Judge. With the passage of Republic Act Number 9282 (R.A. 9282) on April 23, 2004, the CTA became an appellate Court, equal in rank to the Court of Appeals. Under Section 1 of the new law, the Court is headed by a Presiding Justice and assisted by five (5) Associate Justices. They shall have the same qualifications, rank, category, salary, emoluments and other privileges, be subject to the same inhibitions and disqualifications and enjoy the same retirement and other benefits as those provided for under existing laws for the Presiding Justice and Associate Justices of the Court of Appeals. A decision of a division of the CTA may be appealed to the CTA En Banc, and the latter's decision may further be appealed by verified petition for certiorari to the Supreme Court.

On June 16, 2019, the Court celebrated its 65th Founding Anniversary.

Expanded jurisdiction

On June 12, 2008, Republic Act Number 9503 (R.A. 9503) was enacted and took effect on July 5, 2008. This enlarged the organizational structure of the CTA by creating a Third Division and providing for three additional justices. Hence, the CTA is now composed of one Presiding Justice and eight Associate Justices. The CTA may sit en banc or in three divisions with each division consisting of three justices. The CTA, as one of the courts comprising the Philippine Judiciary, is under the supervision of the Supreme Court of the Philippines.

Previously, only decision, judgment, ruling or inaction of the Commissioner of Internal Revenue, the Commissioner of Customs, the Secretary of Finance, the Secretary of Trade and Industry, or the Secretary of Agriculture, involving the National Internal Revenue Code and the Tariff and Customs Code on civil matters are appealable to the Court of Tax Appeals. The expanded jurisdiction transferred to the CTA the jurisdiction of the Regional Trial Courts and the Court of Appeals over matters involving criminal violation and collection of revenues under the National Internal Revenue Code and Tariff and Customs Code. It also acquired jurisdiction over cases involving local and real property taxes which used to be with the Regional Trial Court and the Court of Appeals.

2008 organizational expansion
Gloria Macapagal Arroyo on June 12, 2008, signed into law Republic Act 9503 (An Act Enlarging the Organizational Structure of the Court of Tax Appeals, Amending for the Purpose Certain Sections of the Law Creating the Court of Tax Appeals, and for Other Purposes), which added three more members (and one more division) to the court. The new law was enacted "to expedite disposition of tax-evasion cases and increase revenues for government to fund social services, food, oil and education subsidies and infrastructure."

Incumbent justices 

The Court of Tax Appeals consists of a Presiding justice and eight associate justices. Cui-David, whose tenure began on November 28, 2021.

Presiding Justice

Associate Justice

Appointed by President Gloria Macapagal-Arroyo

Appointed by President Benigno Aquino III

Appointed by President Rodrigo Duterte

Appointed by President Ferdinand Marcos,Jr.

Divisions

Court demographics

By law school

By appointing President

By gender

By tenure

Court of Tax Appeals Justices since June 11, 1954

The rule of seniority

The Associate Justices of the Court are usually ordered according to the date of their appointment. There are no official ramifications as to this ranking, although the order determines the seating arrangement on the bench and is duly considered in all matters of protocol. Within the discretion of the Court, the ranking may also factor into the composition of the divisions of the Court.

The incumbent Justice with the earliest date of appointment is deemed the Senior Associate Justice. The Senior Associate Justice has no constitutional or statutory duties, but usually acts as Acting Presiding Justice during the absence of the Presiding Justice. The Senior Associate Justice is also usually designated as the chairperson of the second division of the Court.

The following became Senior Associate Justices in their tenure in the Court of Tax Appeals:

See also

Supreme Court of the Philippines
Court of Appeals of the Philippines
Sandiganbayan
Philippines
Political history of the Philippines
Constitution of the Philippines

References
The Official Website of The Court of Tax Appeals
The Organizational Structure of The Court of Tax Appeals  
Republic Act 1125, An Act Creating the Court of Tax Appeals (CTA)  
Republic Act 9282, An Act Expanding the Jurisdiction Of the Court of Tax Appeals (CTA)  
Republic Act 9503, An Act Enlarging The Organizational Structure of the Court of Tax Appeals (CTA) 

Notes

External links

Philippines: Gov.Ph: About the Philippines  – Justice category
The Philippines Court of Tax Appeals – Official website
List of CTA Justices  – List of Justices of the CTA

Appellate courts
Courts in the Philippines
Taxation in the Philippines
Tax courts
1954 establishments in the Philippines
Courts and tribunals established in 1954